Constructive possession is a legal fiction to describe a situation in which an individual has actual control over chattels or real property without actually having physical control of the same assets. At law, a person with constructive possession stands in the same legal position as a person with actual possession.

For example, if one's car is sitting in one's driveway, one has physical possession of the car. However, any person with the key has constructive possession, as they may take physical possession at any time without further consent from one.

Constructive possession is an important concept in both criminal law, regarding theft and embezzlement, and civil law, regarding possession of land and chattels. For example, if someone steals your credit card number, the actual credit card never leaves your actual possession, but the person who has stolen the number does have constructive possession, and could most likely be charged with theft of your credit card information.

Constructive possession is also an important concept in cases of seizure of goods by private or government authorities. Take, for example, a large piece of equipment. Should money be lent against the value of the equipment, and the loan goes into default, the creditor may find it difficult to actually remove the equipment in a timely manner. However, it may by notice to the borrower take constructive possession, which effectively prevents the borrower from further using the equipment pending its removal. Similarly, when a landlord exercises a contractual remedy of distraint of goods for unpaid rent, the landlord need not remove the goods from the premises, but may take constructive possession of the goods through a simple declaration.

However, a person who makes it impossible to take possession of another's property has taken actual possession, not constructive possession. For example, if someone chains someone else's car to an immovable object, he or she has taken possession of it even though he or she has not moved it.

Constructive possession can also refer to items inside of a vehicle. It is possible for the owner and driver of the vehicle to be in constructive possession of all items inside their car. If a minor were to be driving their car with passengers who have possession of alcohol or any illegal substance, the driver may be cited for constructive possession

A person can be charged with constructive possession of an illegal device if they possess the otherwise legal material to assemble it. If a person has in his possession or control the ingredients to make an explosive device, he can be charged with constructive possession of that device.

In regards to determining if a firearm is loaded, some states with strict gun control laws apply the concept of constructive possession in establishing that one is in possession of a loaded firearm if the individual has both the firearm and its ammunition in their possession or readily accessible, regardless of whether or not a live round is in the firing chamber or a magazine with live ammunition has been inserted into the firearm. In this context the firearm would be considered "legally loaded" by law, even though it may not be physically loaded.

References

Legal fictions
Property law